The Estonian Silverball is an annual award by Estonian Football Journalists' Club, given to the footballer for the best goal scored for the Estonia national football team. The award was launched in 1995. Konstantin Vassiljev has won the award a record six times.

Winners

References

External links
Overview: Silverball winners 13 May 2020

Estonia national football team
Association football trophies and awards
Awards established in 1995
1995 establishments in Estonia
Estonian sports trophies and awards